Hemigobius mingi, commonly known as the banded goby, is a species of goby found in brackish and marine waters in the South-east Asia. The Catalog of Fishes treats Hemigobius mingi as a synonym of Hemigobius melanurus.

References 

Fish of Thailand
Gobionellinae
Taxa named by Albert William Herre
Fish described in 1936